Eduardo Varela is a Mexican journalist who works as commentator for ESPN Deportes and ESPN Latin America.

Born in Mexico City, Varela graduated with a degree in journalism from the school of journalism at Carlos Septien Garcia, Mexico's top university for journalism.

He began work in 1994 at ESPN. His commentary duties include the NFL, college football, and tennis.

References

Living people
ESPN Latin America
National Football League announcers
Canadian Football League announcers
College football announcers
Tennis commentators
Major League Baseball broadcasters
Year of birth missing (living people)